Minuscule 720 (in the Gregory-Aland numbering), Θε20 (von Soden), is a Greek minuscule manuscript of the New Testament, on paper. It is dated by a colophon to the year 1138 or 1139. The manuscript has complex contents. Scrivener labelled it as 825e.

Description 

The codex contains the text of the New Testament except Book of Acts and Apocalypse, on 296 (118 + 178) paper leaves (size ).

The text is written in one column per page, 56 lines per page.

It contains a Theophylact's commentary to the Gospels.

The order of books is unusual: Mark, John, Matthew, the Catholic epistles, Luke, and the Pauline epistles. Epistle to the Hebrews is placed after Philemon, Romans and 1-2 Corinthians after Hebrews.

Text 

The Greek text of the codex is mixed. Kurt Aland placed it in Category III.

It was not examined by using Claremont Profile Method.

History 

According to the colophon it was written in 1138 or 1139, by Leo, a monk.

The manuscript once belonged to John Sambucky.

It was added to the list of New Testament manuscripts by Scrivener (825) and Gregory (720e for the Gospels, 258a for the Catholic epistles, 308p for the Pauline epistles). Gregory saw the manuscript in 1887.

At present the manuscript is housed at the Austrian National Library (Theol. gr. 79. 80) in Vienna.

See also 

 List of New Testament minuscules
 Biblical manuscript
 Textual criticism

References

Further reading 

 

Greek New Testament minuscules
12th-century biblical manuscripts
Biblical manuscripts of the Austrian National Library